Boat people are the Vietnamese who fled South Vietnam.

Boat people may also refer to:

People 
 Boat people (Hong Kong) or Tanka people
 Boat people, Rohingya people fleeing Burma by sea during the 2015 refugee crisis
 Người Tàu, an alternative name for Hoa people
 Balseros, the name given to boat people who fled Cuba in self-constructed or precarious vessels.

Other uses
 Boat People (film), a 1982 Hong Kong film about Vietnamese refugees in the territory
 The Boat People (band), an indie pop band from Australia

See also 
 Fisherman
 Sailor
 Sea Gypsies (disambiguation), various ethnicities who live largely or principally on boats